The 1965 American Football League draft took place on November 28, 1964. Held via telephone conference call, it remains the only draft in major professional football history to be held without a central location.  The NFL draft was held the same day.

With the first overall pick, the New York Jets selected quarterback Joe Namath.

Player selections

Round one

Round two

Round three

Round four

Round five

Round six

Round seven

Round eight

Round nine

Round ten

Round eleven

Round twelve

Round thirteen

Round fourteen

Round fifteen

Round sixteen

Round seventeen

Round eighteen

Round nineteen

Round twenty

Redshirt draft

Red Shirt Round one

Red Shirt Round two

Red Shirt Round three

Red Shirt Round four

Red Shirt Round five

Red Shirt Round six

Red Shirt Round seven

Red Shirt Round eight

Red Shirt Round nine

Red Shirt Round ten

Red Shirt Round eleven

Red Shirt Round twelve

Notable undrafted players

See also
 1965 NFL draft
 List of American Football League players
 History of American Football League draft
 List of professional American football drafts

References

External links
 1965 AFL Draft

1965
Draft
American Football League draft